First Set is a live album by pianist Cedar Walton recorded in Denmark in 1977 and released on the Danish SteepleChase label.

Reception

Allmusic awarded the album 3 stars calling it "a fine recording – the piano sounds excellent, the audience is felt but not heard, and the mix is full and warm". The Penguin Guide to Jazz praised the dynamism of the performance of "Off Minor".

Track listing 
All compositions by Cedar Walton except where noted.
 Introduction - 0:48    
 "Off Minor" (Thelonious Monk) - 11:27    
 "For All We Know" (J. Fred Coots, Sam M. Lewis) - 8:02    
 Introduction - 0:08    
 "Holy Land" - 7:09    
 "I'm Not So Sure" - 8:53    
 "Ojos de Rojo" - 7:56

Personnel 
Cedar Walton - piano 
Bob Berg - tenor saxophone
Sam Jones - bass
Billy Higgins - drums

References 

Cedar Walton live albums
1978 live albums
SteepleChase Records live albums
Albums recorded at Jazzhus Montmartre